Charles Asati (born 3 March 1946) is a Kenyan former athlete, winner of a gold medal in 4 × 400 m relay at the 1972 Summer Olympics.

Biography
At the 1968 Summer Olympics, Charles Asati reached to the quarterfinal of 200 m and was a member of Kenyan 4 × 400 m relay team, which won the surprise silver medal, with a time of 2:59.6.

At the 1970 British Commonwealth Games, Asati won a gold medal in 400 m and 4 × 400 m relay and was third in 200 m. He also won the 400 m and 4 × 400 m relay gold medals in 1973 All-African Games.

At the Munich Olympics, Asati was fourth in 400 m and won the gold medal as a member of the Kenyan 4 × 400 m relay team.

Asati won 400 metres gold medal at the 1973 All-Africa Games

Asati ended his running career in the 1974 British Commonwealth Games, where he won again both golds in 400 m and 4 × 400 m relay

External links 

1946 births
Living people
Kenyan male sprinters
Athletes (track and field) at the 1968 Summer Olympics
Athletes (track and field) at the 1972 Summer Olympics
Olympic athletes of Kenya
Olympic gold medalists for Kenya
Olympic silver medalists for Kenya
Commonwealth Games medallists in athletics
Athletes (track and field) at the 1970 British Commonwealth Games
Athletes (track and field) at the 1974 British Commonwealth Games
Commonwealth Games gold medallists for Kenya
Medalists at the 1972 Summer Olympics
Medalists at the 1968 Summer Olympics
Olympic gold medalists in athletics (track and field)
Olympic silver medalists in athletics (track and field)
African Games gold medalists for Kenya
African Games medalists in athletics (track and field)
Athletes (track and field) at the 1973 All-Africa Games
20th-century Kenyan people
Medallists at the 1970 British Commonwealth Games
Medallists at the 1974 British Commonwealth Games